Croitana aestiva, the desert sand-skipper, is a butterfly of the family Hesperiidae. It is endemic to the Northern Territory, Australia.

The wingspan is about 20 mm.

External links
Australian Insects
Australian Faunal Directory

Trapezitinae
Butterflies described in 1979